Ali Qeshlaqi (also Romanized as ‘Alī Qeshlāqī; also known as ‘Alī Qeshlāq) is a village in Garmeh-ye Jonubi Rural District, in the Central District of Meyaneh County, East Azerbaijan Province, Iran. At the 2006 census, its population was 72, in 13 families.

References 

Populated places in Meyaneh County